Zoo Empire is a 3D interactive construction and management simulation, much like Zoo Tycoon and Wildlife Park before it. The player must successfully create and manage a zoo that gathers sufficient profits. As the player moves through the game, he will acquire objects that can improve game play. The object of the game is to create a "zoo empire".  Zoo Empire has a platinum edition, Marine Park Empire, which added aquariums and marine animals, but also includes the other animals.

Marine Park Empire

Marine Park Empire is a platinum edition of Zoo Empire released on September 22, 2005. Marine Park Empire includes major updates such as better AI, new interface, a major graphics update, and overall an easier-to-manage way of running one's empire. Marine Park Empire also introduces new marine animals, but still contains all animals from Zoo Empire. It has 60 animals, over 150 game structures, and 21 scenario scenes.

Reception

Zoo Empire

Zoo Empire received "mixed" reviews according to the review aggregation website Metacritic.

Marine Park Empire

Marine Park Empire also received "mixed" reviews according to Metacritic.

References

External links
 Zoo Empire official website
 
 
 

2004 video games
Business simulation games
Video games developed in China
Video games set in zoos
Video games with expansion packs
Windows games
Windows-only games